The 20th Massachusetts Volunteer Infantry, also known as the "Harvard Regiment," was a regiment of infantry in the American Civil War. The regiment was so nicknamed because the officers of the 20th were young Harvard graduates. In addition, some, but not all, of the private soldiers had attended Harvard. The 20th was organized at Camp Meigs in Readville, August 29 to September 4, 1861. After training they left Massachusetts for Washington, D. C., September 4. They would fight until the war's conclusion being mustered out on July 16 and discharged July 28, 1865.

Brigade, divisional and corps attachments 
Attached to Lander's Brigade, Division of the Potomac, to October, 1861. Lander's Brigade, Stone's (Sedgwick's) Division, Army of the Potomac, to March, 1862. 3rd Brigade, 2nd Division, 2nd Army Corps, Army of the Potomac, to March, 1864. 1st Brigade, 2nd Division, 2nd Army Corps, to July, 1865.

Battles 
With the exception of First Bull Run, the 20th participated in all of the major battles and many of the smaller battles fought by the Army of the Potomac. Their baptism of fire occurred at Ball's Bluff on October 21, 1861. Other battles included the Seven Days, Antietam, Fredericksburg, Chancellorsville, Gettysburg,  the Wilderness, Spotsylvania Court House, the Siege of Petersburg, and the Appomattox Campaign.

Casualties 
The 20th regiment lost 17 officers and 243 enlisted men killed and mortally wounded, and one officer and 148 enlisted men from disease. The total casualties were 409. The regiment ranks first among Massachusetts regiments and fifth among Union regiments in total casualties.

Notable members 
Henry L. Abbott
William Bartlett
Joseph Hayes
Oliver Wendell Holmes, Jr.
Norwood "Pen" Hallowell
Edward Needles Hallowell
William Raymond Lee
Francis Winthrop Palfrey
Paul Joseph Revere
Henry Martyn Tremlett

See also

 List of Massachusetts Civil War units
 Massachusetts in the Civil War

Notes

References

External links
Pvt of 20th Mass killed in 1863
 
 

Units and formations of the Union Army from Massachusetts
1861 establishments in Massachusetts
Military units and formations established in 1861
Military units and formations disestablished in 1865